Sir Nicholas Alexander Brathwaite OBE (8 July 1925 – 28 October 2016) was the head of government of Grenada for two periods, first as Chairman of the Interim Advisory Council (1983 to 1984) established after the United States invasion of Grenada, and latterly as Prime Minister from 1990 to 1995.

Brathwaite was born in Carriacou, Grenada. He got education from Teacher's Training College in Trinidad and University of the West Indies in Jamaica. Following the 1983 invasion of Grenada, Brathwaite, a member of the National Democratic Congress (NDC), was appointed by Governor-General Sir Paul Scoon to reestablish the Grenadian government. Brathwaite became prime minister and chairman of the advisory council in December 1983, when American troops withdrew. He led Grenada's return to democracy, and served as prime minister for a year, until his party lost the December 1984 elections.

Brathwaite was elected as the leader of the NDC in 1989. The NDC won the 1990 elections, and he served as prime minister again from March 1990 to February 1995. He also held the portfolio of finance minister. He also served as foreign minister during some of that time. He resigned shortly before the 1995 elections, which the NDC lost.

He was appointed an OBE in 1975 and was knighted in 1995. He died on 28 October 2016 at the age of 91.

References

1925 births
2016 deaths
Prime Ministers of Grenada
Finance ministers of Grenada
Members of the House of Representatives of Grenada
Members of the Privy Council of the United Kingdom
Government ministers of Grenada
National Democratic Congress (Grenada) politicians
Foreign ministers of Grenada
Knights Bachelor
Officers of the Order of the British Empire
Politicians awarded knighthoods
Carriacouan politicians
University of the West Indies alumni
20th-century Grenadian politicians